Old Mortuary Chapel is a medieval Grade I listed building in St Mary's churchyard, Carew, Pembrokeshire, Wales.

Structure
The building has two storeys under a slate roof, is oriented east–west, and is built from limestone rubble. It is accessed by external steps. It has a vaulted undercroft.

Monument
There is an exterior monument to John Relly, an early Calvinist Methodist leader who died in 1777.

Uses
The undercroft dates from the 14th or 15th century, and may have been an ossiary. In 1625 the building was referred to as a schoolhouse, and was used for this purpose until 1872. In 1833, the school educated 50 pupils, and 70 attended Sunday School. In 1846 it became a national school with up to 116 children until the village school opened in 1872. The building may have been used as a mortuary chapel, and is known by that name. After 1872, the building, which has a large blocked-up window, was used as a committee room, store and as a residence, housing paupers as late as about 1840. The building has been locally known as "The Oratory". Its current use is as a parish meeting room and Sunday School. S. Lewis, in 1833, describes the building:

References

Further reading
 R Scourfield, History of St Mary's Church, Carew (1994);
 W G Spurrell, History of Carew (1921), pp. 44–57, 81–87, 89–94, 103–130

External links
Official website
Historical information and further sources on GENUKI

Carew
Chapels in Pembrokeshire